Boris Focşa (born 10 May 1968) is a Moldovan politician. He was the Minister of Culture in the First Vlad Filat Cabinet and in the Second Filat Cabinet.

He is a member of the Democratic Party of Moldova.

References

External links 
 Government of Moldova

 

Living people
1968 births
People from Telenești District
Moldovan male actors
Democratic Party of Moldova politicians